The Iglesia de San Esteban (in Valencian: Església de Sant Esteve) is a parish church located in Plaça de Sant Esteve in the city of Valencia, in the Valencian Community, Spain.

History
The Iglesia de San Esteban is among the oldest churches in Valencia; it is built, in the Gothic style, on the site of a mosque that stood in the city when it was under Muslim rule. It is a rather small church, not far from the Cathedral.

According to one legend the site was that of an old Roman temple dedicated to Hercules. San Esteban was the notaries' church. St. Vincent Ferrer (1350–1419) and St. Luis Bertrán (1526–1581) were baptized here.

"The Last Supper", along with "The Martyrdom of Saint Stephen" and other scenes from the saint's life, painted around 1562 by Juan de Juanes, formed the main altarpiece. They are now in the Museo del Prado.

The main church is open on Sundays and Holy Days of Obligation; the chapel is open daily for mass.

References

Roman Catholic churches in Valencia
Valencia
Valencia
Valencia
Valenica
Esteban
Esteban
Esteban
Neoclassical church buildings in Spain